Hughestown is a borough in the Greater Pittston area of Luzerne County, Pennsylvania, United States. The population was 1,326 at the 2020 census.

History 
In 1934, the right arm of Hughestown resident Harry Tompkins was crushed by an Erie Railroad train. The resulting U.S. Supreme Court case, Erie Railroad Co. v. Tompkins, laid the foundation for a large part of modern American civil procedure.

Geography
U.S. Route 11 runs through the southern portion of the borough. Hughestown is served by the Pittston Area School District. Robert Yaple Memorial Park is located in central Hughestown. Most of the homes and businesses are located in the western portion of the borough, while the eastern section consists of mostly forests and culm banks.

Demographics

At the 2000 census there were 1,541 people, 615 households, and 444 families living in the borough. The population density was 1,734.6 people per square mile (668.5/km2). There were 659 housing units at an average density of 741.8 per square mile (285.9/km2).  The racial makeup of the borough was 99.35% White, 0.13% African American, 0.06% Pacific Islander, 0.13% from other races, and 0.32% from two or more races. Hispanic or Latino of any race were 0.13%.

There were 615 households, 25.2% had children under the age of 18 living with them, 57.6% were married couples living together, 10.4% had a female householder with no husband present, and 27.8% were non-families. 24.6% of households were made up of individuals, and 13.8% were one person aged 65 or older. The average household size was 2.50 and the average family size was 2.98.

The age distribution was 19.1% under the age of 18, 7.1% from 18 to 24, 27.1% from 25 to 44, 28.5% from 45 to 64, and 18.2% 65 or older. The median age was 43 years. For every 100 females there were 97.3 males. For every 100 females age 18 and over, there were 88.2 males.

The median household income was $41,750 and the median family income  was $50,938. Males had a median income of $33,611 versus $22,422 for females. The per capita income for the borough was $20,246. About 4.7% of families and 5.7% of the population were below the poverty line, including 4.2% of those under age 18 and 7.1% of those age 65 or over.

Government
Hughestown's current mayor is Wayne D. Quick, Jr., and the President of Council is Robert Gable.

References

Populated places established in 1836
Boroughs in Luzerne County, Pennsylvania
1879 establishments in Pennsylvania